Cytharopsis kyushuensis is a species of sea snail, a marine gastropod mollusc in the family Mangeliidae.

Description
The length of the shell attains 15 mm.

Distribution
This marine species occurs in the East China Sea; off Japan and the Philippines.

References

 Shuto, Tsugio. Turrid Gastropods from the Upper Pleistocene Moeshima Shell Bed. Faculty of Science, Kyushu University, 1965.
 Higo, S., Callomon, P. & Goto, Y. (1999). Catalogue and bibliography of the marine shell-bearing Mollusca of Japan. Osaka. : Elle Scientific Publications. 749 pp.

External links

kyushuensis
Gastropods described in 1965